Ayoub Boukhari (born 6 May 1997) is a Dutch football player of Moroccan descent. He plays for Sparta Rotterdam and their youth team.

Club career
He made his Eerste Divisie debut for Sparta Rotterdam on 30 November 2018 in a game against Helmond Sport as a 78th-minute substitute for Gregor Breinburg.

References

External links
 
 Ayoub Boukhari  profile at Sparta Rotterdam

1997 births
Footballers from Rotterdam
Dutch sportspeople of Moroccan descent
Living people
Dutch footballers
Association football midfielders
Sparta Rotterdam players
Eerste Divisie players
Tweede Divisie players